Members of the Legislative Council of Northern Rhodesia from 1954 until 1958 were elected on 19 February 1954. The first session of the newly elected council started on 10 April. There were twelve elected members, 11 appointed members and four ex officio members. The number of appointed members increased to 12 in 1958.

List of members

Elected members

Replacements

Nominated members

Replacements

Ex officio members

References

1954